Matt Wells is an actor and writer best known for his work in the critically acclaimed film Crown and Anchor. He began in national television on MuchMusic in 2002 as host of the show Going Coastal, followed by Where you at Baby?. and later became a presenter on MuchMore.

Wells grew up in Mount Pearl, Newfoundland and Labrador. He moved to Halifax in 2000 and then to Toronto, Ontario in 2007. He was also a member of the hard rock band Bucket Truck from 1996 to 2007 as singer, and also produced and directed music videos for the band.

In 2018 Wells appeared in the film Crown and Anchor, alongside his former Bucket Truck bandmate Michael Rowe.

References

Canadian male film actors
Much (TV channel) personalities
People from Mount Pearl

Canadian male television actors
Male actors from Newfoundland and Labrador
Musicians from Newfoundland and Labrador
Living people
Year of birth missing (living people)
Canadian VJs (media personalities)